Anthene is a genus of butterflies in the family Lycaenidae, commonly called the ciliate blues or hairtails. The genus was erected by Edward Doubleday in 1847.

Subgenera and species
Listed alphabetically within subgenera:
Subgenus Anthene Doubleday, 1847 (Afrotropical realm)
Anthene abruptus (Gaede, 1915)
Anthene afra (Bethune-Baker, 1910)
Anthene alberta (Bethune-Baker, 1910)
Anthene amarah (Guérin-Méneville, 1847) – black-striped hairtail
Anthene arnoldi (N. Jones, 1917)
Anthene arora Larsen, 1983
Anthene atewa Larsen & Collins, 1998
Anthene aurobrunnea (Ungemach, 1932)
Anthene bakeri (H. H. Druce, 1910)
Anthene barnesi Stevenson, 1940
Anthene bipuncta (Joicey & Talbot, 1921)
Anthene bjoernstadi Collins & Larsen, 1991
Anthene buchholzi (Plötz, 1880)
Anthene butleri (Oberthür, 1880) – pale hairtail
Anthene chirinda (Bethune-Baker, 1910)
Anthene collinsi D'Abrera, 1980
Anthene contrastata Ungemach, 1932 – mashuna hairtail
Anthene crawshayi (Butler, 1899)
Anthene definita (Butler, 1899) – common hairtail
Anthene discimacula (Joicey & Talbot, 1921)
Anthene emkopoti Larsen & Collins, 1998
Anthene erythropoecilus (Holland, 1893)
Anthene flavomaculatus (Grose-Smith & Kirby, 1893)
Anthene helpsi Larsen, 1994
Anthene hobleyi (Neave, 1904)
Anthene hodsoni (Talbot, 1935)
Anthene indefinita (Bethune-Baker, 1910)
Anthene irumu (Stempffer, 1948)
Anthene ituria (Bethune-Baker, 1910)
Anthene janna Gabriel, 1949
Anthene juanitae Henning & Henning, 1993 – Juanita's hairtail
Anthene juba (Fabricius, 1787)
Anthene kampala (Bethune-Baker, 1910)
Anthene katera Talbot, 1937
Anthene kersteni (Gerstaecker, 1871) – Kersten's hairtail
Anthene kikuyu (Bethune-Baker, 1910)
Anthene lachares (Hewitson, [1878])
Anthene larydas (Cramer, [1780])
Anthene lasti (Grose-Smith & Kirby, 1894)
Anthene lemnos (Hewitson, 1878) – large hairtail
Anthene leptala (Courvoisier, 1914)
Anthene leptines (Hewitson, 1874)
Anthene levis (Hewitson, 1878)
Anthene ligures (Hewitson, 1874)
Anthene lindae Henning & Henning, 1994 – Linda's hairtail
Anthene liodes (Hewitson, 1874) – liodes hairtail
Anthene locuples (Grose-Smith, 1898)
Anthene lunulata (Trimen, 1894)
Anthene lychnaptes (Holland, 1891)
Anthene lychnides (Hewitson, 1878)
Anthene lysicles (Hewitson, 1874)
Anthene madibirensis (Wichgraf, 1921)
Anthene mahota (Grose-Smith, 1887)
Anthene makala (Bethune-Baker, 1910)
Anthene melambrotus (Holland, 1893)
Anthene millari (Trimen, 1893) – Millar's hairtail
Anthene minima (Trimen, 1893) – little hairtail
Anthene montana Kielland, 1990
Anthene mpanda Kielland, 1990
Anthene ngoko Stempffer, 1962
Anthene nigropunctata (Bethune-Baker, 1910)
Anthene onias (Hulstaert, 1924)
Anthene opalina Stempffer, 1946
Anthene otacilia (Trimen, 1868) – Otacilia hairtail or Trimen's ciliate blue
Anthene pitmani Stempffer, 1936
Anthene princeps (Butler, 1876) – cupreous hairtail
Anthene pyroptera (Aurivillius, 1895)
Anthene radiata (Bethune-Baker, 1910)
Anthene ramnika D'Abrera, 1980
Anthene rhodesiana Stempffer, 1962
Anthene rothschildi (Aurivillius, 1922)
Anthene rubricinctus (Holland, 1891)
Anthene rubrimaculata (Strand, 1909)
Anthene rufomarginata (Bethune-Baker, 1910)
Anthene ruwenzoricus (Grünberg, 1911)
Anthene saddacus (Talbot, 1935)
Anthene schoutedeni (Hulstaert, 1924)
Anthene scintillula (Holland, 1891)
Anthene sheppardi Stevenson, 1940
Anthene starki Larsen, 2005
Anthene suquala (Pagenstecher, 1902)
Anthene sylvanus (Drury, 1773)
Anthene talboti Stempffer, 1936 – Talbot's hairtail
Anthene ukerewensis (Strand, 1909)
Anthene uzungwae Kielland, 1990
Anthene versatilis (Bethune-Baker, 1910)
Anthene wilsoni (Talbot, 1935)
Anthene xanthopoecilus (Holland, 1893)
Anthene zenkeri (Karsch, 1895)
Subgenus Anthene Doubleday, 1847; Australasia-species group (Indomalayan realm, Australasian realm, Himalayan area in the Palearctic realm):
Anthene emolus (Godart, [1824]) – ciliate blue
Anthene licates (Hewitson, 1874)
Anthene lycaenina (R. Felder, 1868) – pointed ciliate blue
Anthene lycaenolus Tite, 1966
Anthene lycaenoides (Felder, 1860)
Anthene paraffinis (Fruhstorfer, 1916)
Anthene philo Hopffer, 1874
Anthene seltuttus (Röber, 1886)
Anthene villosa (Snellen, 1878)
Subgenus Neurellipes Bethune-Baker, 1910 Afrotropical realm
Anthene aequatorialis Stempffer, 1962
Anthene chryseostictus (Bethune-Baker, 1910)
Anthene fulvus Stempffer, 1962
Anthene gemmifera (Neave, 1910)
Anthene likouala Stempffer, 1962
Anthene lusones (Hewitson, 1874)
Anthene staudingeri (Grose-Smith & Kirby, 1894)
Subgenus Neurypexina Bethune-Baker, 1910 Afrotropical realm
Anthene kalinzu (Stempffer, 1950)
Anthene lamprocles (Hewitson, 1878)
Anthene lyzanius (Hewitson, 1874)
Anthene quadricaudata (Bethune-Baker, 1926)
Subgenus Triclema Karsch, 1893 Afrotropical realm
Anthene africana (Bethune-Baker, 1926)
Anthene coerulea (Aurivillius, 1895)
Anthene fasciatus (Aurivillius, 1895)
Anthene hades (Bethune-Baker, 1910)
Anthene inconspicua (H. H. Druce, 1910)
Anthene inferna (Bethune-Baker, 1926)
Anthene kamilila (Bethune-Baker, 1910)
Anthene kimboza (Kielland, 1990)
Anthene krokosua (Larsen, 2005)
Anthene lacides (Hewitson, 1874)
Anthene lamias (Hewitson, 1878)
Anthene lucretilis (Hewitson, 1874)
Anthene lutzi (Holland, 1920)
Anthene marshalli (Bethune-Baker, 1903)
Anthene nigeriae (Aurivillius, 1905)
Anthene obscura (H. H. Druce, 1910)
Anthene oculatus (Grose-Smith & Kirby, 1893)
Anthene phoenicis (Karsch, 1893)
Anthene rufoplagata (Bethune-Baker, 1910)
Anthene tisamenus (Holland, 1891)
Subgenus unknown
Anthene georgiadisi Larsen, 2009

References

 (1775-1780). De Uitlandsche Kapellen ... Asia, Africa en America ... Amsterdam, Baalde & Utrecht, 4 vols.
 (1847). List of the Specimens of Lepidopterous Insects in the Collection of the British Museum 2: [ii], 57 pp. London.
 (1935). In  (1935). Trans. R. ent. Soc. Lond. 83: 313-447.
  (1993). Description of a new species of Anthene Doubleday (Lepidoptera: Lycaenidae) from the Transvaal, South Africa. Metamorphosis 4(4): 156-158.
  (2009). Anthene georgiadisi sp. nov. (Lep.: Lycaenidae) – a new butterfly from Liberia. Entomologist's record and journal of variation, 121 (1): 47-51. 
 (1866). On the lepidopterous insects of Bengal. Proceedings of the Zoological Society of London. 1865: 755-823, 3 pls.
 (1946). Contribution a l'etude des Lycaenidae de la faune ethiopienne. Revue fr. Ent. 13: 8-19.
  (2001). Twenty new butterflies from the Solomon Islands (Lepidoptera: Hesperiidae; Lycaenidae; Nymphalinae; Satyrinae; Danainae). British Journal of Entomology and Natural History 14: 1-27.
 (1966). A revision of the genus Anthene from the Oriental region. Bulletin of the British Museum (Natural History) 18: 253-275, 2 pls, 28 text figs.
 (1932). Contribution a l'étude des lépidoptères d'Abyssinie. Mém. Soc. Sci. nat. phy. Maroc. 32: 1-122, 2 pls., 1 map.
 (2008). Checklist of Afrotropical Papilionoidea and Hesperioidea. 7th Edn. (April 2007). Downloaded from  Afrotropical Butterflies.

External links

Takanami, Yusuke & Seki, Yasuo (2001). "Genus Anthene". A Synonymic List of Lycaenidae from the Philippines. Archived June 30, 2001. With images.

 
Lycaenidae genera